Magnetic tape cartridge and magnetic tape cassette both refer to a small plastic unit containing a length of magnetic tape on at least one reel. The unit may contain a second "take-up" reel or interoperate with such a reel in an associated tape drive.  At least 142 distinct types have been known to exist.

The phrase cassette tape is ambiguous in that there is no common dictionary definition so depending upon usage it has many different meanings, as for example any one the one of 106 different types of audio cassettes, video cassettes or data cassettes  listed at The Museum of Obsolete Media.

The phrase cartridge tape is also ambiguous with 36 different types of audio, video or data cartridges listed at The Museum of Obsolete Media.

From time to time the terms tape cartridge and tape cassette are used to describe the same product.

In current production are the Cassette tape, the LTO tape cartridge and the IBM 3592 tape cartridge.

Audio 
 Analog based
 Cassette tape, a two-spool tape cassette format for analog audio recording and playback and introduced in 1963 by Philips
 DC-International, a format that was created by Grundig after Phillips had abandoned an earlier format that was being created alongside the Compact Cassette 
 8-track tape, continuous loop tape system introduced in 1964
 PlayTape, a format similar to 8-track that was created by Frank Stanton 
 HiPac, a format created by Pioneer as an alternative to 8-track to be used outside of North America
 Mini-Cassette, a small cassette tape cartridge developed by Phillips for dictation machines and data storage for the Philips P2000 home computer
 Microcassette, a small cassette tape format that used the same width of magnetic tape as the Compact Cassette but in a much smaller cartridge developed by Olympus
 Picocassette, a cassette tape cartridge format that was half the size of the Microcassette made by JVC
 RCA tape cartridge, a cartridge tape created by RCA and introduced in 1958 meant to take the hassle of handling unruly tapes easier
 Elcaset, a format introduced in 1976 by Sony based on the RCA tape cartridge that was supposed to be more convenient than its predecessor

 Digital based
 Digital Tape Format, a magnetic tape data storage format developed by Sony
 Digital Audio Tape (DAT), a signal recording and playback medium developed by Sony and introduced in 1987
 Digital Compact Cassette (DCC), a magnetic tape sound recording format introduced by Philips and Matsushita in late 1992 and marketed as the successor to the standard analog Compact Cassette
 NT (cassette), a small cassette tape created by Sony that was smaller than a Picocassette only used for dictation machines but had plans to be used in music

Video 
 Videocassette, a cartridge containing videotape
 Analog based tapes
 VHS, the most successful consumer videocassette format, introduced by JVC/Matsushita
 VHS-C, a compact VHS videocassette format for camcorders
 Betamax, another common consumer videocassette format, introduced by Sony
 Betacam, an industrial version of Betamax that was for professional use
 Akai VK, a short lived videocassette format for use with video cameras 
 Cartrivision, an early videocassette format and the first to offer feature films for rental
 Compact Video Cassette, a short lived videocassette format for use with video cameras, introduced by Funai
 8 mm video format, a popular videocassette format for camcorders, introduced by Sony
 Hi8, a higher definition development of 8 mm
 U-matic, the first videocassette format when introduced by Sony in 1971, mostly adopted in professional/industrial settings
 V-Cord, an early videocassette format introduced by Sanyo 
 Video 2000, a 1980s videocassette format introduced by Philips and Grundig
 Video Cassette Recording, an early videocassette format introduced by Philips, with later variants VCR-LP and Grundig's SVR
 VX (videocassette format), a short lived videocassette format introduced by Matsushita, branded 'Quasar' in the United States 
 Digital based tapes
 DV, a digital video tape format & codec launched to record video for both professional & amateur use
 MicroMV, the smallest videocassette ever produced and was launched by Sony in 2001
 Digital8, the digital version of Video8 (8 mm video) introduced by Sony 
 D-VHS, a version of VHS used to store digital video launched in 1998
 Digital Betacam, a digital version of Betacam that delivered digital recorded video
 Digital-S, a digital version of VHS launched by JVC in 1995 to compete with Digital Betacam

Computer data 
 Digital Data Storage cassette (DDS)
 Data8 cassette, a videocassette derivative by Exabyte
 Digital Tape Format cassette, developed by Sony (DTF)
 Digital Linear Tape cartridge (DLT)
 IBM 7340 cartridge, one of the first tape formats packaged in a cassette
 Linear Tape-Open cartridge (LTO)

See also 
 Digital cassettes
 Timeline of audio formats
 Tape drive, a data storage device that reads and writes data on a magnetic tape, many of which are cassette-based

References 
References

Tape recording
Electronics lists